Mandalgovi (also Mandalgov' or Mandalgobi) is the capital of the Dundgovi Province of Mongolia, about 300 km south of Ulaanbaatar on the border of the Gobi Desert. It has 10,506 inhabitants (2005), 10,299 (2007). The city administrative unit's official name is Saintsagaan sum .

History
Mandalgovi was originally a village when it consisted only of 40 yurts. In 1942, it was gained status as a town.

Climate

Mandalgovi has a cold semi-arid climate (Köppen climate classification BSk) bordering on a cold desert climate (Köppen BWk) with warm summers and very cold winters. Most precipitation falls in the summer as rain. Winters are very dry.

Transportation
The city is connected to Ulaanbaatar by a 300 km paved road completed in October 2013.

References

External links
Mandalgovi at Encyclopædia Britannica
Map at uk.multimap.com

Districts of Dundgovi Province
Aimag centers